Embolomeri is an order of tetrapods or stem-tetrapods, possibly members of Reptiliomorpha. Embolomeres first evolved in the Early Carboniferous (Mississippian) Period and were the largest and most successful predatory tetrapods of the Late Carboniferous (Pennsylvanian) Period. They were specialized semiaquatic predators with long bodies for eel-like undulatory swimming. Embolomeres are characterized by their vertebral centra, which are formed by two cylindrical segments, the pleurocentrum at the rear and intercentrum at the front. These segments are equal in size. Most other tetrapods have pleurocentra and intercentra which are drastically different in size and shape.

Embolomeres were among the earliest large carnivorous tetrapods, with members such as the crocodilian-like Proterogyrinus appearing in the Visean stage of the Carboniferous. They declined in diversity during the Permian period, though at least one representative (Archeria) was common in the Early Permian. Embolomeres went extinct shortly before the end of the Permian.

Classification

The order Embolomeri was first named by Edward Drinker Cope in 1884 during his revision of "batrachian" (amphibian) evolution. Embolomeri was differentiated from several other newly named amphibian orders, such as "Rachitomi", by the presence of intercentra and pleurocentra of the same size and shape, that being large cylinders. At the time, embolomere fossils were uncommon, so Cope could only identify "cricotids" such as Cricotus as possessing embolomerous vertebrae. The genus name "Cricotus" is dubious, as it has been used by Cope to refer to embolomere fossils spanning anywhere between mid-Pennsylvanian deposits of Illinois and the Permian red beds of Texas. Most paleontologists now refer the red bed "Cricotus" specimens to the genus Archeria.

Michel Laurin (1998) formally defined Embolomeri as "the last common ancestor of Proterogyrinus and Archeria and all of its descendants." This definition excludes Eoherpeton, which is almost always considered a close ally of the group. Some authors place Silvanerpeton or chroniosuchians as close relatives as well, though they are generally agreed to lie outside Embolomeri proper.

The poorly-defined group Anthracosauria is sometimes considered synonymous with Embolomeri, and the group's namesake, Anthracosaurus, is an embolomere. However, other authors use the term "Anthracosauria" in reference to a broader group which includes embolomeres in combination with various other reptile-like amphibians (reptiliomorphs). Reptiliomorphs are all tetrapods more closely related to living reptiles and synapsids (mammals and their ancestors), rather than living amphibians. Despite this, reptiliomorphs likely had amphibian-like biological traits, such as water-based reproduction.

Many studies conducted since the 1990s have also placed the group Lepospondyli as closer to amniotes than embolomeres were. Lepospondyls are a particularly unusual group of tetrapods, with some members (i.e. brachystelechids) very similar to lissamphibians and others (i.e. tuditanids) very similar to amniotes. If lepospondyls are both close relatives of amniotes and the ancestors of modern amphibians, then that means that crown-Tetrapoda (descendants of the common ancestor to all living tetrapods) is a much more restricted group than previously assumed. In this situation, various traditional orders of Tetrapoda such as Embolomeri and Temnospondyli actually would qualify as stem-tetrapods due to having evolved prior to the split between modern amphibians and amniotes.

However, most authors consider temnospondyls to be the ancestors of modern amphibians. This would suggest that embolomeres are likely reptiliomorphs (closer to reptiles) and within the clade Tetrapoda. However, even this classification is not stable, as some analyses have found embolomeres to be more basal than temnospondyls.

Below is a cladogram from Ruta et al. (2003):

Genera

References

 
Mississippian first appearances
 Permian extinctions